Hals über Kopf   is a German television series. The plot took place in West Berlin.

See also
List of German television series

External links
 

1986 German television series debuts
1992 German television series endings
German-language television shows
German children's television series
ZDF original programming